Grosz may refer to:
 Grosz, a coin valued as a hundredth of a Polish złoty
 Kraków grosz, 14th-century coins of Kraków
Grosz (surname)

See also 
 Gros (disambiguation)
 Gross (disambiguation)